Hylotelephium, syn. Sedum, is a genus of flowering plants in the family Crassulaceae. Various species have been hybridized by horticulturalists to create new cultivars. Many of the newer ones are patented.

Hylotelephium hybrids
Those cultivars marked  have been given an Award of Garden Merit by the Royal Horticultural Society. 
'Bertram Anderson'   - very similar to "Vera Jameson," and with the same parentage, this is a newer and "improved" version of this cross (rose-red)
’Carl’  - rose-pink
'Dazzleberry' - Parentage unknown. Patented.
'Herbstfreude'   - This hybrid is also known in English as "Autumn Joy," which is a literal translation from the German. It is a hybrid between Sedum telephium and H. spectabile. It is self-sterile, as it exhibits female flower parts only
’Marchant’s Best Red’  - deep reddish pink 
’Matrona’  - pale pink flowers
’Mr Goodbud’ (PBR)  - pink-purple: breeder’s rights protect this cultivar from unauthorised propagation
’Red Cauli’  - bright pink
’Ruby Glow’  - deep crimson-purple
'Vera Jameson'   - This is reportedly a natural hybrid discovered in her garden one day by Ms. Jameson. It is said to be a cross between Sedum telephium var. maximum 'Atropurpureum' and H. cauticolum 'Ruby Glow'

References

 
Hybrid plants